The blue-masked leafbird (Chloropsis venusta) is a species of bird in the family Chloropseidae. It is endemic to humid montane forest in the western regions of the Indonesian island of Sumatra. Generally, it lives in areas from 600 to 1,500 m (1,969–4,921 ft) in elevation. It is the smallest species of leafbird.

It is considered near threatened due to habitat loss.

References

External links
Image at ADW

blue-masked leafbird
Birds of Sumatra
Endemic fauna of Sumatra
blue-masked leafbird
blue-masked leafbird
Taxonomy articles created by Polbot